The Derbyshire Arrows are an English basketball club based in Dronfield, Derbyshire.  The Arrows play in National Basketball League Division 2 North, the third tier of British basketball. The club also have strong links with the city of Sheffield, having formerly been based at the University of Sheffield, and maintaining a partnership with the University's team.

History
Founded in 1991 to compete in local league competition, the Men's team joined the National Basketball League in 1998, starting in Division 3.  The first couple of years in national competition saw mixed results, before changes at both club and league in 2000 ushered in a golden era for the club.  First, former BBL talent Garnet Gayle joined as player/coach, closely followed by a restructure of the league which rebranded the third tier as Division 2.  The Arrows then claimed the 2000/2001 league title without suffering a single defeat, earning promotion to Division 1 in the process.  Further glories were to follow, taking back-to-back doubles of the league and playoff titles in 2001/2002 and 2002/2003.  However, the club were denied a promotion to the NBL Conference as their home court did not meet the minimum standard required.

To allow the club to advance further, they moved to the English Institute of Sport in Sheffield, rebranding as the City of Sheffield Arrows.  The national league was also rebranded as the English Basketball League in 2003, and the new league structure saw the Arrows finally admitted to the top level of English competition, taking a place in the new EBL Division 1.  Another league and playoff double was to follow in 2005, this time with the National Trophy added to the EBL Division One title and playoff titles.  Since winning their last title in 2005, the club have fallen from their peak, a gradual decline in results culminating in a last-place league finish in 2010 and relegation to Division 2.  The drop to a more modest league saw the club return to their original Killamarsh home and reclaim their former name in 2011, and despite being ever-present in the end-of-season playoffs, the team have yet to return to Division 1.

Honours

NBL Division 1 League Champions
 2002, 2003
EBL Division 1 League Champions
 2005
NBL Division 1 Playoff Champions
 2002, 2003
EBL Division 1 Playoff Champions
 2005
NBL Division 2 League Champions
 2001
National Trophy Champions
 2005

Season-by-season records

Notes:
From 2000-2003 the NBL Conference operated as the second tier league, ahead of Division One.
In 2003 the NBL was replaced by the EBL, which reinstated Division One as the second tier.

References

External links
 Official Derbyshire Arrows website

Derbyshire Arrows
Sport in Derbyshire
Dronfield
1991 establishments in England
Basketball teams established in 1991
Sport in Sheffield